The AAI RQ-2 Pioneer is an unmanned aerial vehicle (UAV) that had been used by the United States Navy, Marine Corps, and Army, and deployed at sea and on land from 1986 until 2007. Initially tested aboard USS Iowa, the RQ-2 Pioneer was placed aboard s to provide gunnery spotting, its mission evolving into reconnaissance and surveillance, primarily for amphibious forces.

It was developed jointly by AAI Corporation and Israel Aircraft Industries. The program grew out of successful testing and field operation of the Tadiran Mastiff UAV by the American and Israeli militaries.

Essentially, the Pioneer is an upgraded IAI Scout which was re-engined to accommodate a greater payload by request of the US Navy. To accomplish this, the original "Limbach" two-cylinder two-stroke engine was replaced with a Fichtel & Sachs two-cylinder two-stroke. The Limbach motor used a 71 cm propeller from Propeller Engineering and Duplicating, Inc. of San Clemente, California. The newer, more powerful Fichtel & Sachs motor was outfitted with a 74 cm propeller (which spins in the opposite direction) from the Sensenich Propeller Manufacturing Company of Lancaster, Pennsylvania.

Operation

Launched by rocket assist (shipboard), by catapult, or from a runway, the Pioneer recovers into a net (shipboard) or with arresting gear after flying up to five hours with a  payload. It flies day or night missions with a gimbaled EO/IR sensor, relaying analog video in real time via a C-band line-of-sight (LOS) data link. Since 1991, Pioneer has flown reconnaissance missions during the Persian Gulf, Somalia (UNOSOM II), Bosnia, Kosovo and Iraq conflicts.  In 2005, the Navy operated two Pioneer systems (one for training) and the Marines operated two, each with five or more aircraft. It is also operated by Israel and the Republic of Singapore Air Force. In 2007 Pioneer was retired by the US Navy and was replaced by the Shadow UAV.

Internationally, Pioneer drones are perhaps most remembered for their role in the 1991 Gulf War, when a Pioneer launched by the   observed Iraqi troops on Failaka Island surrendering shortly after s attack on their trenchlines. When navy officials offered to transfer a Pioneer to the Smithsonian Institution, curators at the National Air and Space Museum specifically asked for the UAV that Iraqi troops surrendered to during the Gulf War.

In the 1991 Gulf War, the US Army operated a UAV Platoon from Ft. Huachuca, Arizona.  The UAV Platoon conducted flight surveillance and target acquisition missions from KKMC and later, the unit pushed north (Operation Sand Hawk) where US Army combat engineers built a metal runway for the aircraft to launch and recover.

The "R" is the Department of Defense designation for reconnaissance; "Q" means unmanned aircraft system. The "2" refers to its being the second of a series of purpose-built unmanned reconnaissance aircraft systems.

Specifications (RQ-2)
 Primary Function: Artillery Targeting and Acquisition, Control of Close Air Support, Reconnaissance and Surveillance, Battle Damage Assessment, Search and Rescue, Psychological Operations

Operators

 United States Navy
 VC-6 "Firebees": Naval Station Norfolk (decommissioned)
 Training Air Wing 6 UAV Detachment: Naval Air Station Whiting Field (decommissioned)
 United States Marine Corps
 VMU-1 'Watchdogs': Marine Corps Air Ground Combat Center Twentynine Palms, California
 VMU-2 'Night Owls': MCAS Cherry Point, North Carolina

Sri Lanka Air Force
Sri Lanka Navy
US ARMY, Ft. Huachuca, AZ., UAV Platoon deployed Jan. 1991-May 1991.

See also

References

External links

 IAI/AAI RQ-2 Pioneer

RQ-2 Pioneer
1980s United States military reconnaissance aircraft
Twin-boom aircraft
Single-engined pusher aircraft
Unmanned military aircraft of the United States